Licenza premio is a 1951 Italian comedy film directed by Max Neufeld and starring Nino Taranto and Carlo Croccolo.

Plot
Italy, early 1950s. Two troopers, Domenico, Neapolitan, and Pinozzo, Piedmontese, are sent on a special mission: they must lead to Rome a mare of their lieutenant, who will participate in the international horse show.

Cast

Nino Taranto: Domenico Errichiello
Carlo Croccolo: Pinozzo Molliconi
Virgilio Riento: Enrico
Lilia Landi: Maria Luisa
Nerio Bernardi: Count Carlo
Rossana Rory: Paola
Marcella Rovena: Zingara
Pietro Tordi: Zingaro
Virginia Belmont: Gilda

Release
The film was released in Italy on September 8, 1951

Notes

External links 
 

1951 films
1950s Italian-language films
Italian comedy films
1951 comedy films
Italian black-and-white films
1950s Italian films